Rocket is a web framework written in Rust. Its design was inspired by Rails, Flask, Bottle, and Yesod.

Rocket is licensed under MIT License or Apache License.

References

External links
 

Web frameworks
Free software programmed in Rust